Jacques Léauté (1 May 1883 – 14 September 1916) was a French freestyle swimmer. He competed in the men's 200 metre freestyle at the 1900 Summer Olympics.

References

External links
 

1883 births
1916 deaths
French male freestyle swimmers
Olympic swimmers of France
Swimmers at the 1900 Summer Olympics
Place of birth missing